Jacques Mrozek (born 11 May 1950 in Paris) is a French former figure skater who won the 1973 national title in men's singles. He competed at two Winter Olympics, placing 20th in 1968 (Grenoble) and 14th in 1972 (Sapporo). He finished in the top ten at the 1973 World Championships in Bratislava and at three European Championships – 1969 (Garmisch-Partenkirchen), 1971 (Zurich), and 1973 (Cologne).

Competitive highlights

References

French male single skaters
Olympic figure skaters of France
Figure skaters at the 1968 Winter Olympics
Figure skaters at the 1972 Winter Olympics
1950 births
Living people